The 2002–03 ECHL season was the 15th season of the East Coast Hockey League. The Brabham Cup regular season champions were the Toledo Storm and the Kelly Cup playoff champions were the Atlantic City Boardwalk Bullies.

League changes
The Macon Whoopee relocated to Lexington, Kentucky, as the Lexington Men O' War.

The New Orleans Brass ceased operations due to the arrival of the New Orleans Hornets basketball team. The NBA team moved into the Brass' arena but wanted the Brass to pay for every conversion between the hockey and basketball configuration, an expense the Brass could not afford.

The Mobile Mysticks also suspended operations prior to the season and would relocate to Duluth, Georgia, beginning with the 2003–04 season.

All-Star Game
The ECHL All-Star Game was held at Germain Arena in Estero, Florida and was hosted by the Florida Everblades.  The Northern Conference All-Stars dominated the game, beating the Southern Conference All-Stars 8–2.  Atlantic City's Scott Stirling was named Most Valuable Player.

Regular season

Final standings
Note: GP = Games played; W = Wins; L= Losses; SOL = Shootout losses; GF = Goals for; GA = Goals against; Pts = PointsGreen shade = Clinched playoff spot; Blue shade = Clinched division; (z) = Clinched home-ice advantage

Northern Conference

Southern Conference

Kelly Cup playoffs

Northern Conference

Division semifinals

Division finals

Conference finals

Kelly Cup finals

ECHL awards

See also
 ECHL All-Star Game
 Kelly Cup

References

External links
ECHL website

 
ECHL seasons
3